Love Story 1999 is a 1998 Indian Telugu-language romantic comedy film directed by K. Raghavendra Rao. The film had an ensemble cast starring Prabhu Deva, Vadde Naveen, Ramya Krishna, Laila and Rambha.

Cast 

Prabhu Deva as Vamsi
Vadde Naveen as Krishna
Ramya Krishna as Raaji, Vamsi's colleague
Laila as Meena
Rambha as Swapna
Jayachitra as Chamundeswari
Prakash Raj as D. K. Bose
Annapoorna as Krishna's mother
Sudhakar as Babji
Brahmanandam
Gundu Hanumantha Rao as Hanumantu
Ravi Babu
Chitti Babu Punyamurthula
Tirupathi Prakash
Bandla Ganesh
Ananth as priest
Mada Venkateswara Rao
Junior Relangi

Soundtrack

Release and reception 
A critic from Andhra Today wrote that "One is left to wonder why the audience's patience is put to test by a 'wafer' (thin) story". Love Story 1999 did not perform well at the box office despite having a well known director and Prabhu Deva opted against signing straight Telugu films for a period afterwards. The film was dubbed and released in Tamil as Nee Enakku Uyiramma in October 1999 owing to the popularity of the actors in the Tamil film industry.

References 

1998 films
1990s Telugu-language films
Films directed by K. Raghavendra Rao
Films scored by Deva (composer)